Malcom Sylas Edjouma Laouari (born 8 October 1996) is a French professional footballer who plays as a midfielder for Liga I club FCSB.

Career

France
Edjouma began his youth career with the youth academies of PSG and Toulouse.

On 29 July 2018, Edjouma transferred to FC Lorient, and was loaned back to US Concarneau for the remainder of the season. Edjouma made his professional debut with Lorient in a 0–0 Ligue 2 tie with Le Havre AC on 28 July 2018.

On 10 January 2019, Edjouma was loaned out to fellow second tier club Red Star F.C. for the remainder of the season.

On 16 July 2019, Edjouma was loaned out to Ligue 2 side Chambly.

Romania
On 23 January 2020, Edjouma signed a two-and-a-half-year contract with Romanian club Viitorul Constanța.

Personal life
Edjouma was born in Toulouse, France, to a Cameroonian father and a Moroccan mother.

Career statistics

Club

References

External links
 
 SoFoot Profile
 Foot-National Profile
 
 FCL Profile

1996 births
Living people
Footballers from Toulouse
French footballers
French sportspeople of Cameroonian descent
French sportspeople of Moroccan descent
Association football midfielders
Balma SC players
ASM Belfort players
FC Lorient players
US Concarneau players
LB Châteauroux players
Red Star F.C. players
FC Chambly Oise players
FC Viitorul Constanța players
FC Botoșani players
FC Steaua București players
Liga I players
Ligue 2 players
Championnat National players
Championnat National 3 players
Expatriate footballers in Romania
French expatriate sportspeople in Romania